Cash and Carry is an American television game show hosted by Dennis James that ran on the then-both affiliates of the DuMont Television Network from June 20, 1946, to July 1, 1947. This made it not only the sole program aired on Thursday nights by the network (although it moved to Tuesday nights in April), but also the first "network" television game show (all previous television games and quizzes were aired on only one station).

This series was sponsored by Libby's Foods, and produced by Art Stark, later producer of The Tonight Show Starring Johnny Carson from 1962 to 1969. The show was set in a supermarket, with contestants taking cans, which had questions for them to answer, off the shelves.

Format
In his book, The Forgotten Network: DuMont and the Birth of American Television, David Weinstein described Cash and Carry as an "early television adaptation of Truth or Consequences". James asked contestants questions attached to cans of the sponsor's products, with correct answers worth  $5, $10, or $15. Other tasks were stunts, such as a husband and wife having to work together for a common goal (such as the wife, blindfolded, having to feed her husband).

Home viewers could call in during the show to guess what was hidden under a barrel.

Episode status
No episodes are known to exist, as almost all television broadcasts from the first year of United States network television are lost due to a lack of means to preserve such content. The known exceptions are a few episodes of Kraft Television Theatre from early 1947 which were made to test the kinescope process which allowed television series to be preserved.

Even after the kinescope process was created, many shows were still not regularly preserved until the late 1960s.

See also
 List of programs broadcast by the DuMont Television Network
 List of surviving DuMont Television Network broadcasts
 1946-47 United States network television schedule
 Supermarket Sweep
 Shop 'til You Drop

Bibliography
 David Weinstein, The Forgotten Network: DuMont and the Birth of American Television (Philadelphia: Temple University Press, 2004) 
 Alex McNeil, Total Television, Fourth edition (New York: Penguin Books, 1980) 
 Tim Brooks and Earle Marsh, The Complete Directory to Prime Time Network TV Shows, Third edition (New York: Ballantine Books, 1964)

References

External links
 
 DuMont historical website

DuMont Television Network original programming
1940s American game shows
1946 American television series debuts
1947 American television series endings
Black-and-white American television shows
English-language television shows
Lost television shows